This list of the prehistoric life of Maryland contains the various prehistoric life-forms whose fossilized remains have been reported from within the US state of Maryland.

Precambrian
The Paleobiology Database records no known occurrences of Precambrian fossils in Maryland.

Paleozoic

Selected Paleozoic taxa of Maryland

 †Amphiscapha
 †Amplexopora
 †Archimylacris
 †Atrypa
 †Atrypa reticularis – report made of unidentified related form or using admittedly obsolete nomenclature
 †Aviculopecten
 †Bassipterus
 †Bellerophon
  †Calymene
 †Calymene camerata
 †Calymene cresapensis
 †Calymene niagarensis – or unidentified comparable form
 †Camarotoechia
 †Camarotoechia andrewsi
 †Camarotoechia litchfieldensis
 †Camarotoechia tonolowayensis
 †Chonetes
 †Chonetes novascoticus
  †Cincinnetina
 †Cincinnetina multisecta
 †Clitendoceras
 †Composita
 †Composita ovata – tentative report
 †Cornulites
 †Cypricardinia
 †Cypricardinia elegans
 †Dakeoceras
  †Dalmanites
 †Dalmanites limulurus
 †Dolichopterus
 †Edmondia
 †Eldredgeops
 †Eldredgeops rana
 †Ellesmeroceras
 †Encrinurus
 †Eospirifer
 †Erettopterus – tentative report
 †Euomphalus
 †Eurypterus
 †Eurypterus remipes
  †Favosites
 †Favosites niagarensis – or unidentified comparable form
 †Flexicalymene
  †Goniatites
 †Gyrodoma
 †Hallopora
 †Holopea
 †Hyolithes
 †Isotelus
 †Lingula
  †Lysorophus
 †Mcqueenoceras
 †Megamolgophis
 †Meristina
 †Metacoceras
 †Naticopsis
 †Neospirifer
 †Neospirifer dunbari – tentative report
 †Obolella
 †Obolus – tentative report
  †Olenellus
 †Ormoceras
 †Orthoceras
 †Platyceras
 †Proterocameroceras
  †Pterygotus
 †Ribeiria
 †Rioceras
 Solemya
 † Solenopsis
 †Sowerbyella
 †Spirifer
 †Spirifer vanuxemi
 †Stenosiphon
 †Strophomena
 †Tainoceras
  †Tentaculites
 †Trigonocera
 †Trimerus
 †Waeringopterus
 †Worthenia

Mesozoic

Selected Mesozoic taxa of Maryland

 Acirsa
  †Acrocanthosaurus – or unidentified comparable form
 †Acteon
 †Aenona
 †Agerostrea
 †Allognathosuchus – or unidentified comparable form
 †Allosaurus
 †Amyda
 †Ancilla
 †Anomia
 †Anomoeodus
 Arrhoges
 Astarte
  †Astrodon
 †Astrodon johnstoni – type locality for species
  †Baculites
 †Baculites baculus
 †Bottosaurus
 †Bottosaurus harlani
 Botula
 †Botula conchafodentis
 †Botula ripleyana
 Cadulus
 Caestocorbula
 †Caestocorbula crassaplica
 †Caestocorbula crassiplica
 †Caestocorbula percompressa
 †Caestocorbula terramaria
 Carcharias
 †Caveola
  †Ceratodus
 Cerithium
  Chiloscyllium
 †Cimoliasaurus
 †Coelosaurus
 †Coelosaurus affinis
 †Coelosaurus antiquus
 †Coelurus
 †Coelurus gracilis – type locality for species
 †Corax
 Corbula
 †Crenella
 †Crenella elegantula
 †Crenella serica
  †Cretolamna
 †Cretolamna appendiculata
 Cucullaea
 †Cucullaea capax
 Cuspidaria
 †Cuspidaria ampulla
 Cylichna
 †Cylichna diversilirata
 †Cylichna incisa
 †Cylindracanthus
 †Cymella
 Dasyatis
  †Deinonychus
 †Deinonychus antirrhopus
  †Deinosuchus
 †Deinosuchus rugosus
 †Dentalium
 †Dentalium leve
 †Discoscaphites
 †Discoscaphites conradi
 †Discoscaphites gulosus
 †Discoscaphites iris
 †Egertonia
 †Enchodus
 †Enchodus dirus
 †Eulima
 †Eulima monmouthensis
 †Euspira
  †Eutrephoceras
 †Ewingia
 †Exogyra
 †Exogyra costata
 Galeorhinus
 Ginglymostoma
 Glossus
 Glycimeris
 Glycymeris
 †Glycymeris rotundata
 †Glyptops
 †Goniopholis
  †Grallator – or unidentified comparable form
 †Halisaurus
 †Halisaurus platyspondylus
 †Hamatia – type locality for genus
 †Hamulus
 Heterodontus
 † Heteromorpha
 †Hoploparia
 †Hybodus
 †Hyposaurus
 †Hyposaurus rogersii
  †Inoceramus
 †Ischyodus
 †Ischyrhiza
 †Ischyrhiza avonicola – or unidentified comparable form
 †Ischyrhiza mira
  †Jeletzkytes
 †Jeletzkytes nebrascensis
 Latiaxis
 Lepisosteus
 Lima
 Limatula
 †Linearis
 Lithophaga
  Lopha
 †Lopha falcata
 †Lopha mesenterica
 †Mathilda
 †Modiolus
 †Modiolus sedesclaris
 †Modiolus sedesclarus
 †Modiolus trigonus
 †Morea
  †Mosasaurus
 †Mosasaurus conodon
 Myliobatis
 †Mytilus – tentative report
 Nebrius
  Nucula
 †Nucula camia
 †Nucula cuneifrons
 †Nucula percrassa
 †Nucula severnensis
  Odontaspis
 †Osteopygis
 Panopea
 †Paralbula
 †Peritresius
 Pholas
 †Pinna
  †Placenticeras
 †Pleurocoelus – type locality for genus
 †Pleurocoelus nanus – type locality for species
 †Plicatoscyllium
 Polinices
  †Priconodon – type locality for genus
 †Priconodon crassus – type locality for species
 †Prognathodon
 †Prognathodon rapax
 †Propanoplosaurus – type locality for genus
 †Propanoplosaurus marylandicus – type locality for species
 †Protocardia
 †Pteria
  †Pterotrigonia
 †Pterotrigonia eufalensis
 †Pterotrigonia eufaulensis
 †Pterotrigonia thoracica
 †Ptychotrygon
 Pycnodonte
 †Pycnodonte vesicularis
 Raja
 Rhinobatos
  †Rhombodus
 Ringicula
 †Ringicula clarki
 †Ringicula pulchella
 Rissoina
 †Sargana
  †Scaphites
 †Scaphites hippocrepis
 Serpula
 †Serratolamna
 †Serratolamna serrata
 †Sphenodiscus
 †Sphenodiscus lobatus
 †Sphenodiscus pleurisepta
  Squalicorax
 †Squalicorax falcatus
 †Squalicorax kaupi
 †Squalicorax pristodontus
 Squatina
 †Stephanodus
 Tellina
 †Tenea
  †Tenontosaurus
  †Thoracosaurus
 Trachycardium
 †Trachycardium eufaulensis
 Turritella
 †Turritella bilira
 †Turritella hilgardi
 †Turritella paravertebroides
 †Turritella tippana
 †Turritella trilira
 †Turritella vertebroides
 †Zephyrosaurus

Cenozoic

Selected Cenozoic taxa of Maryland

 †Abra – tentative report
 Acipenser
 Acropora
 †Acropora palmata
 Acteocina
 Acteon
 †Acus
 †Adocus
  †Aepycamelus – tentative report
 Aetobatus
  †Aglaocetus
 Alca
 †Alca torda – or unidentified comparable form
 †Ambystoma
 †Ambystoma maculatum
 †Ambystoma tigrinum
 Amia
  †Amphicyon
 Amyda
 Anachis
 Anadara
 †Anadara ovalis
 †Anadara transversa
 Anas
 †Anas crecca
 Ancilla – report made of unidentified related form or using admittedly obsolete nomenclature
 Angulus
 Anomia
 †Anomia simplex
 Anticlimax – tentative report
  †Aphelops – tentative report
 Aporrhais
 Aquila
 †Aquila chrysaetos
 †Araeodelphis – type locality for genus
 Arca
 †Archaeohippus
 Architectonica
  †Arctodus
 †Arctodus pristinus
 Argopecten
 †Argopecten irradians
 †Armatobalanus
  Astarte
 †Astarte undata
 Asterias
 †Asterias forbesi – or unidentified comparable form
 Astrangia
 †Astrangia danae
 †Astroscopus – type locality for species
  †Astroscopus countermani – type locality for species
 Astyris
 †Astyris lunata
 Athleta
 Atrina
  †Aulophyseter
 Balaenoptera
 Balanus
 †Balanus crenatus
 Bankia
 Barnea
 Blarina
 †Blarina brevicauda
 †Blarina carolinensis
 Bonasa
  †Bonasa umbellus
 Boreotrophon
 Brachidontes
 †Brachyprotoma
 †Brachyprotoma obtusata
 †Brevoortia
 †Brevoortia tyrannus – or unidentified comparable form
 Bufo
  †Bufo americanus
 †Bufo woodhousei
 Busycon – type locality for genus
 †Busycon carica
 Busycotypus
 †Busycotypus canaliculatus
 Cadulus
 Caecum
 Callinectes
 †Callinectes ornatus
  †Callinectes sapidus
 Calliostoma
 Callista
 Calonectris
 Calyptraea
 †Calyptraea centralis
 Cancellaria
 Cancer
 †Cancer irroratus
 Canis
  †Canis armbrusteri – type locality for species
 †Canis latrans
 †Canis rufus – or unidentified comparable form
 Cantharus
 Carcharhinus
 Carcharias
 Carcharodon
  †Carcharodon hastalis
 Cardita
 Carphophis
 †Carphophis amoenus
 Cassis
 Castor
 †Castor canadensis
 †Cephalotropis – type locality for genus
 Cerastoderma
 Cervus
 Cetorhinus
  †Cetotherium
 Chama
 Chelone
 Chelydra
 †Chelydra serpentina
 †Chesapecten
  †Chesapecten jeffersonius
 Chlamys
 Chrysemys
 †Chrysemys picta
 Circulus – report made of unidentified related form or using admittedly obsolete nomenclature
 Cirsotrema
 Clavus
 Clementia
 Clethrionomys
 †Clethrionomys gapperi – or unidentified comparable form
 Cliona
 Coluber
  †Coluber constrictor
 Concavus
 Condylura
 †Condylura cristata
 Conus
 Corbula
 Crassostrea
 †Crassostrea virginica
 Crepidula
  †Crepidula fornicata
 †Crepidula plana
  †Cretolamna
 †Cretolamna appendiculata
 Crotalus
 †Crotalus horridus
 Crucibulum
  Cryptobranchus
 Cucullaea
 Cumingia
 Cyclocardia
 Cylichna
 Cymatosyrinx
 †Cynarctus
 †Cynarctus wangi – type locality for species
  Cypraea
 †Cyrtopleura costata
 Cythara
 †Cytheris
 Dasyatis
 Dentalium
 Diadophis
 †Diadophis punctatus
 Diodora
  †Diorocetus – type locality for genus
 †Dipoides
 Discinisca
 †Dolicholatirus
 Dosinia
 Echinocardium
 Echinophoria – type locality for genus
 †Ecphora
  †Ecphora gardnerae
 †Ectopistes
 †Ectopistes migratorius
 Elaphe
 †Elaphe vulpina
 Electra
 Elphidium
 Ensis
 †Ensis directus
 †Entobia
  †Eosuchus
 †Eosurcula – or unidentified comparable form
 Epitonium
 †Epitonium humphreysii
 Eptesicus
 †Eptesicus fuscus – or unidentified comparable form
 Equus
 †Equus giganteus
 Erethizon
 †Erethizon dorsatum
  †Euceratherium
 †Euceratherium collinum
 †Euclastes – tentative report
 Eulima
 Eumeces
 †Eumeces fasciatus – or unidentified comparable form
 Eupleura
 †Eupleura caudata
  †Eurhinodelphis
 †Eurhinodelphis longirostris
 Euspira
 †Euspira heros
  Felis
 †Ficopsis
 Fissurella
 †Fistulobalanus
 †Fulgar
 Galeocerdo
 †Galeocerdo aduncus
 †Galeocerdo contortus
 Galeodea
 Gari
 Gastrochaena
 Gavia
 †Gavia immer
  †Gavialosuchus
 Gegania
 Gemma
 †Gemma gemma
 Genota – or unidentified comparable form
 Geukensia
 †Geukensia demissa
 Gibbula – tentative report
  Glaucomys
 Globigerina
 Globigerinoides
 Glossus
 Glycimeris
 Glycymeris
 †Glycymeris americana
 Glyptemys
 †Glyptemys muhlenbergii
  †Gomphotherium
 Gulo
 †Gulo gulo
 Gyrinophilus
 †Gyrinophilus porphyriticus – or unidentified comparable form
 †Hadrodelphis – type locality for genus
 Haminoea
 Hastula
 Haustator
 †Heliadornis – type locality for genus
 Hemipristis
  †Hemipristis serra
 Heterodon
 †Heterodon platyrhinos – or unidentified comparable form
 Hiatella
 †Hiatella arctica
  †Hippotherium
 Hyla
 †Hyla crucifer
 Hyotissa
 Ictalurus
 Ilyanassa
 †Ilyanassa obsoleta
 †Ilyanassa trivittata
 Ischadium
 †Ischadium recurvum
 †Ischyodus
 Isognomon
 Isurus
  †Kentriodon – type locality for genus
 Kuphus – report made of unidentified related form or using admittedly obsolete nomenclature
 Kurtziella
 †Kurtziella cerina
 Lacuna
  †Lagodon
 Lamna
 Lampropeltis
 †Lampropeltis triangulum
 Lasiopodomys
 Lepisosteus
 †Leptophoca – type locality for genus
 †Leptophoca lenis – type locality for species
 Lepus
  †Lepus americanus
 Libinia
 †Libinia dubia
 Lithophaga – or unidentified comparable form
 Littoraria
 †Littoraria irrorata
 Lontra
  †Lontra canadensis
 †Lophocetus
 Lopholatilus
 Lucina
 Lunatia
 Lyonsia
 Macoma
 †Macoma balthica
 Macrocallista
 †Macrokentriodon – type locality for genus
 †Mammut
 †Mammut americanum
 †Mammuthus
 †Mammuthus columbi
  †Mammuthus primigenius
 Marginella
 Marmota
 †Marmota monax
 Martesia
 Mathilda
  †Megalonyx
 Megaptera
 Melampus
 †Melampus bidentatus
 Melanitta
 †Melanitta deglandi
 Meleagris
  †Meleagris gallopavo
 Membranipora
 Menestho
 Mephitis
 †Mephitis mephitis
 Mercenaria
 †Mercenaria mercenaria
 Meretrix
  †Merychippus
 †Mesocetus
  †Metaxytherium
 Microtus
 †Microtus chrotorrhinus – or unidentified comparable form
 †Microtus pennsylvanicus
  †Miracinonyx
 †Miracinonyx inexpectatus
 Mitra
 Modiolus
 †Modiolus modiolus
 †Moira – tentative report
 †Monotherium
 Mulinia
 †Mulinia lateralis
 Mustela
 †Mustela vison – or unidentified comparable form
 †Mya
 †Mya arenaria
 Myliobatis
  †Mylohyus
 †Mylohyus fossilis – type locality for species
  Myodes
 Myotis
 †Myotis grisescens – or unidentified comparable form
 Mytilus
 †Nanosiren – tentative report
 Napaeozapus
  †Napaeozapus insignis
 Narona
 Nassa
  Nassarius
 †Nassarius vibex
 Neofiber
 Neotoma – type locality for genus
 †Neotoma floridana
 Nerodia
 †Nerodia sipedon
 Neverita
 Notophthalmus
 †Notophthalmus viridescens – or unidentified comparable form
 Notorynchus
  †Notorynchus cepedianus – type locality for species
 Novocrania
 Nucula
 †Nucula proxima
 †Nuculana acuta
 Ochotona
 †Ochotona princeps – or unidentified comparable form
 Odocoileus
 †Odocoileus virginianus
  Odontaspis
 Odostomia
 Ondatra
 †Ondatra zibethicus
 Opheodrys
 †Opheodrys vernalis
  †Orycterocetus
 †Osteopygis
 Ostrea
 †Otodus
  †Otodus megalodon
 Otus
 †Oxyrhina
 †Oxyrhina desorii
 Pagurus
 †Pagurus pollicaris
 †Palaeocarcharodon
  †Palaeophis
 Pandora
 Panopea
 Panopeus
 †Panopeus herbstii
 Panthera
 †Panthera leo
 †Panthera onca
 Parascalops
 †Parascalops breweri
  †Parietobalaena – type locality for genus
 †Parietobalaena palmeri – type locality for species
 Pecten
 Pekania
 †Pelocetus – type locality for genus
 Perisoreus
 †Perisoreus canadensis
 Peromyscus
 †Peromyscus leucopus – or unidentified comparable form
 Petricola
 †Petricola pholadiformis
  †Phenacodus – tentative report
 Phenacomys
 †Phocageneus
  Pholadomya
 †Physeterula
 Pinna
 Pipistrellus
 Pitar
 †Pitar morrhuanus
 Pitymys
 Placopecten
  †Platygonus
 Plecotus
 Plethodon
 Pleurotomella
 Pogonias
 †Pogonias cromis – or unidentified comparable form
 Polydora
 Polystira
  †Presbyornis
 †Prionodon
 Prionotus
 †Prionotus evolans – or unidentified related form
 Propebela
 Prophaethon – tentative report
 †Protocardia
 Pseudacris
 †Pseudacris triseriata
 Pseudoliva
 Pteria
 †Ptychosalpinx
  Puffinus
 Pycnodonte
 Quinqueloculina
 †Rana
  †Rana clamitans
 †Rana pipiens
 †Rana sylvatica
 Rangia
 Ranzania
 Retusa
  Rhinoptera
 Rhynchobatus
 †Roccus
 †Roccus saxatilis
 †Rotalia
 Salamandra
 †Scala – report made of unidentified related form or using admittedly obsolete nomenclature
 †Scala
  †Scaldicetus
 †Scapanorhynchus
 Scaphander
 Scaphella – type locality for genus
 Sceloporus
 †Sceloporus undulatus – or unidentified comparable form
  †Schizodelphis
 Schizoporella
 †Schizoporella unicornis
 Sciaenops
 Sciurus
 †Sciurus carolinensis
 †Scutella
 †Sediliopsis – type locality for genus
 Seila
 †Seila adamsii
 Semele – tentative report
 Semele
 Serpulorbis
  Siphonalia
  †Smilodon
 †Smilodon fatalis
 †Solarium
 Solen
 Sorex
 †Sorex cinereus
 †Sorex fumeus
 Spermophilus
 †Spermophilus tridecemlineatus
 †Sphyraenodus
  Sphyrna
 Spilogale
 †Spilogale putorius – type locality for species
 Spisula
  †Squalodon
 †Squalodon calvertensis – type locality for species
 Squatina
 Squilla
 †Squilla empusa
 Stewartia
 Stramonita
 Strioterebrum
 †Syllomus
 Sylvilagus
 †Sylvilagus floridanus
  Synaptomys
 †Synaptomys cooperi
 Syrnola
 Tagelus
 Tamias
 †Tamias striatus
 Tamiasciurus
 †Tamiasciurus hudsonicus
 †Tapiravus
  Tapirus
  †Tasbacka
 Taxidea
 †Taxidea taxus – type locality for species
 Teinostoma
 Tellina
 Terebra
 Terebratula
 Teredo
 Terrapene
 †Terrapene carolina
 Testudo
 Textularia
 Thamnophis
  †Thecachampsa
 †Thecachampsa antiqua
 Thomomys – type locality for genus
 Thracia
  Tremarctos
 †Tremarctos floridanus
 Triloculina
 Trionyx – report made of unidentified related form or using admittedly obsolete nomenclature
 Triphora
 Tritonium
 Trochita
 †Trygon
 †Tuba – tentative report
 Turricula – report made of unidentified related form or using admittedly obsolete nomenclature
 Turris – report made of unidentified related form or using admittedly obsolete nomenclature
 Turritella
  Tursiops
 Typhis
 Umbraculum – tentative report
 Urosalpinx
 †Urosalpinx cinerea
 Ursus
 †Ursus americanus
 Venericardia
 Vespertilio
 Vitrinella
 Volutifusus
 Vulpes
  †Xiphiacetus
 Xiphias
 Yoldia
 †Yoldia limatula

References
 

Maryland